Megyn Marie Kelly (born November 18, 1970) is an American conservative journalist and media personality. She currently hosts a talk show and podcast, The Megyn Kelly Show, that airs live daily on SiriusXM. She was a talk show host at Fox News from 2004 to 2017 and a host and correspondent with NBC News from 2017 to 2018. She is also active in posting to her Instagram page and YouTube channel.

During her time at Fox News, Kelly hosted America Live and, before that, co-hosted America's Newsroom with Bill Hemmer. From 2007 to 2012, the two reporters hosted Fox News Channel's New Year's Eve specials. Kelly also hosted The Kelly File from October 2013 to January 2017. In 2014, she was included in the TIME list of the 100 most influential people. Kelly left Fox News in January 2017 and joined NBC News. She started hosting the third hour of the morning show Today with her program titled Megyn Kelly Today in September 2017. The show was cancelled in October 2018 after a segment discussing blackface, and she left the network in January 2019.

Early life
Kelly was born in Champaign, Illinois, to Edward Francis Kelly, Ed.D., who taught in the School of Education at the State University of New York at Albany, and Linda (née DeMaio), a homemaker. She is of Italian and German descent on her mother's side and Irish descent on her father's. She was raised Catholic. Her father died of a heart attack in 1985 when she was 15 years old.

Kelly attended Tecumseh Elementary School in suburban Syracuse, New York. When she was 9, her family moved to Delmar, New York, a suburb of Albany, where she attended Bethlehem Central High School. She obtained an undergraduate degree in political science from the Maxwell School of Citizenship and Public Affairs at Syracuse University in 1992 and earned a J.D. from Albany Law School in 1995. 

Kelly was an associate attorney in the Chicago office of law firm Bickel & Brewer LLP. In fall 1996, she co-wrote an article, Litigation, "The Conflicting Roles of Lawyer as Director", for the American Bar Association's journal. She later worked at Jones Day for nine years, where one of her clients was the credit bureau Experian.

Television career

Early career
In 2003, Kelly moved to Washington, D.C., where she was hired by the ABC affiliate WJLA-TV as a general assignment reporter. She covered national and local events, including live coverage of the confirmation hearings for U.S. Supreme Court Justice Samuel Alito and Chief Justice John G. Roberts, the retirement of Justice Sandra Day O'Connor, the death of Chief Justice William Rehnquist, and the 2004 presidential election. CNN president Jonathan Klein later said he regretted not hiring Kelly as a reporter at the beginning of her career, as she was "the one talent you'd want to have from somewhere else".

2004–2017: Fox News
In 2004, Kelly applied for a job at Fox News. She contributed legal segments for Special Report with Brit Hume and hosted her own legal segment, Kelly's Court, during Weekend Live. She appeared in a weekly segment on The O'Reilly Factor and occasionally filled in for Greta Van Susteren on On the Record, where most of her reporting focused on legal and political matters. She occasionally contributed as an anchor, but more often as a substitute anchor on weekends. On February 1, 2010, Kelly began hosting her own two-hour afternoon show, America Live, which replaced The Live Desk. She was a guest panelist on Fox News' late-night satire program Red Eye w/ Greg Gutfeld. In 2010, viewership for America Live increased by 20%, averaging 1,293,000 viewers, and increased by 4% in the 25–54 age demographic, averaging 268,000 viewers. In December 2010, Kelly hosted a New Year's Eve special with Bill Hemmer.

Kelly received media attention for her coverage of the results of the 2012 United States presidential election. On election night, Fox News' decision desk projected that Obama would win the state of Ohio along with a second term after part of the results had been released. In response to Karl Rove's opposition to this projection, Kelly walked backstage to the decision desk on camera and spoke with them; she also asked Rove, "Is this just math that you do as a Republican to make yourself feel better? Or is this real?"

Kelly left America Live in July 2013 and took maternity leave. That October she began hosting a new nightly program, The Kelly File. The Kelly File was occasionally the channel's ratings leader, topping The O'Reilly Factor.

In December 2013, Kelly commented on a Slate article on The Kelly File: "For all you kids watching at home, Santa just is white, but this person is just arguing that maybe we should also have a black Santa," adding, "But Santa is what he is, and just so you know, we're just debating this because someone wrote about it." Kelly also said that Jesus was a white man later in the segment. Soon after, Jon Stewart, Stephen Colbert, Rachel Maddow, Josh Barro, and others satirized her remarks. Two days later, she said on the air that her original comments were "tongue-in-cheek", and that the skin color of Jesus is "far from settled".

In June 2015, Kelly interviewed Jim Bob Duggar and Michelle Duggar of 19 Kids and Counting regarding their son Josh Duggar's alleged molestation of five girls in 2002. She later interviewed two of their daughters, Jill and Jessa. This show's Nielsen national estimates ratings of 3.09 million viewers, above its average 2.11 million, ranked with the 3.2 million for the Malaysia Airlines Flight 17 shootdown coverage and 7.3 million for the Ferguson riots coverage.

In the Republican Party presidential debate on August 6, 2015, Kelly asked then-presidential candidate Donald Trump whether a man of his temperament ought to be elected president, noting that he has called various women insulting names in the past. Kelly's moderating generated a range of media and political reactions and her professionalism was criticized by Trump. Kelly responded to Trump's criticism by saying she would not "apologize for doing good journalism". Trump declined to attend the Iowa January 28 debate that she moderated. After the debate and off-camera, Ted Cruz said that Kelly had referred to Trump off-camera as "Voldemort", though Fox News denied it. Bill Maher complimented Kelly as being "so much better" than the candidates who attended the January 28 debate and argued that she was a more viable candidate for the Republican nomination.

In an interview with CBS News Sunday Morning, Kelly reflected that she was disappointed with the lack of support she received from coworker Bill O'Reilly and CNN, the latter airing a Trump event the same time as the debate. In April, at her request, Kelly met with Trump at Trump Tower, having "a chance to clear the air". The following month, after interviewing Trump and being met with mixed reception, she expressed interest in doing another one with him. In June, she criticized Trump for his claims against Gonzalo P. Curiel's impartiality. In October, a contentious discussion between Kelly and Newt Gingrich on The Kelly File regarding Trump's sexual comments in a 2005 audio recording gained widespread social media reaction.

In March 2016, it was announced that Kelly would host a one-hour prime time special on the Fox network wherein she would interview celebrities from the worlds of "politics, entertainment, and other areas of human interest". The special aired in May 2016, which was a sweeps month. It acquired 4.8 million viewers, but placed third in the ratings. Gabriel Sherman wrote of the stakes for Kelly as "high", elaborating that with Kelly being in the final year of her contract with Fox and having confirmed her ambitions, "[t]he special was essentially a public interview for her next job."

In July 2016, amid allegations of sexual harassment on the part of Fox News CEO Roger Ailes, Kelly was reported to have confirmed that she herself was also subjected to his harassment. Two days after the report, Ailes resigned from Fox News and his lawyer, Susan Estrich, publicly denied the charge.

During her coverage of the 2016 Republican National Convention, her attire received criticism. In a defense of Kelly, Jenavieve Hatch of The Huffington Post commented, "If you're a woman on national television reporting on a political event from hot, humid Cleveland, wearing a weather-appropriate outfit makes you the target of an endless stream of sexist commentary." In September, it was reported that Kelly would be collaborating with Michael De Luca to produce Embeds, a scripted comedy about reporters covering politics, to be aired on a streaming service.
Kelly appeared on the cover of the February 2016 issue of Vanity Fair. In 2016, she was an honoree for Varietys Power of Women for her addressing child abuse.

2017–2018: NBC News 

In late 2016, Kelly was alleged to be actively considering other news networks aside from Fox News, since her contract was a few months from expiring. In January 2017, The New York Times reported that she would leave Fox News for a "triple role" at NBC News, which would include a daytime talk show, a Sunday-night newsmagazine, and becoming a correspondent for major news events and political coverage. She departed Fox News on January 6, 2017, after the last episode of The Kelly File was aired. In January 2017, People quoted an unspecified source that Kelly remained under a non-compete clause with Fox until July 2017 which would prevent her from working for a competitor until the clause expires or is canceled.

On June 2, 2017, Kelly interviewed Russian president Vladimir Putin, first in a panel discussion she moderated at the St. Petersburg International Economic Forum and later in a one-on-one interview for the premiere episode of NBC's Sunday Night with Megyn Kelly, which aired June 4, 2017. Kelly's daytime talk show, Megyn Kelly Today, premiered in September 2017.

Kelly was being paid reportedly between $15 million and $20 million a year at NBC. After an initial run of eight episodes in the summer of 2017, NBC decided to bring her newsmagazine show Sunday Night with Megyn Kelly back for summer 2018 after a hiatus for football and the Winter Olympics, but only periodically. However, this return never materialized. Instead, Kelly continued to report stories for Dateline NBC during the summer of 2018, continuing her work for the show which she joined in 2017.

On October 23, 2018, Kelly was criticized for on-air remarks she made on Megyn Kelly Today related to the appropriateness of blackface as part of Halloween costumes. She recollected that "when I was a kid, that was okay as long as you were dressing up like a character", and defended Luann de Lesseps's use of skin darkening spray to portray Diana Ross. After receiving backlash for her comments, Kelly issued an internal email apologizing for the remarks later that day. On October 26, 2018, NBC canceled Megyn Kelly Today. It had been reported that Kelly was considering ending the program to focus on her role as a correspondent. Her employment was terminated on January 11, 2019, and she was paid the $30 million due for the remainder of her contract.

2019–present: After NBC 
Kelly announced the launch of Devil May Care Media, her media production company, on September 10, 2020, with a podcast, The Megyn Kelly Show. Its first episode premiered on September 28.

On July 6, 2021, it was announced that the podcast would move to Sirius XM on September 7, 2021, to broadcast weekdays at 12 noon ET on the talk radio channel Triumph, along with a video simulcast available to Sirius XM subscribers.

Writing 
In February 2016, Kelly signed an agreement with HarperCollins to write an autobiography scheduled for release later that year, in a deal worth more than $10 million. The book, titled Settle for More, was released on November 15, 2016.

Accolades
 In 2009, Kelly received an award from Childhelp for her work as a Fox News anchor covering the subject of child abuse.
 Kelly was honored with an Alumni Achievement Award from the Albany Law School in 2010 for her 15th class reunion.
 She was included in the 2014 Time list of the 100 most influential people.
 On September 26, 2015, Kelly was inducted into the Hall of Fame at Bethlehem Central High School, her alma mater.

In popular culture
Bombshell, a 2019 film depicting Roger Ailes' sexual abuses and his subsequent resignation from Fox News, was released on December 13, 2019. Kelly is portrayed in the film by Charlize Theron, who was nominated for the Academy Award for Best Actress for her performance. 

Kelly said she was not consulted for the film's content. However, after viewing a screening of the film, Kelly held a roundtable discussion with other involved parties such as Juliet Huddy, Rudi Bakhtiar, Douglas Brunt, and former Fox News producer Julie Zann. Kelly confirmed and denied several moments in the film, while describing the film overall as an emotional experience for her.

Personal life
Kelly married Daniel Kendall, an anesthesiologist, in 2001. The marriage ended in divorce in 2006. In 2008, she married Douglas Brunt, who was then president and CEO of the cybersecurity firm Authentium, and who became a full-time writer and novelist. They have three children, son Yates (b. 2009), daughter Yardley (b. 2011), and son Thatcher (b. 2013).

Politically, Kelly identifies as an independent, and told Variety in 2015 that she had voted for both Democrats and Republicans.

On October 12, 2016, Kelly stated in a segment on her show with Fox News commentator Julie Roginsky that she is a lifelong Catholic. Kelly has appeared at a fundraiser for parental rights organization Moms for Liberty.

See also
 New Yorkers in journalism

References

External links
 
 
 
 

 
1970 births
Living people
20th-century American journalists
20th-century Roman Catholics
21st-century American journalists
21st-century Roman Catholics
20th-century American lawyers
21st-century American lawyers
20th-century American women lawyers
21st-century American women lawyers
Albany Law School alumni
American autobiographers
American people of German descent
American people of Irish descent
American people of Italian descent
American social commentators
American television news anchors
American women journalists
American women podcasters
American podcasters
Catholics from Illinois
Catholics from New York (state)
Corporate lawyers
Fox News people
Illinois Independents
Jones Day people
Journalists from Illinois
Journalists from New York (state)
Lawyers from Syracuse, New York
Maxwell School of Citizenship and Public Affairs alumni
NBC News people
New York (state) Independents
New York (state) lawyers
Lawyers from Albany, New York
People from Champaign, Illinois
Women autobiographers